Olearia glutinosa, commonly known as sticky daisy-bush, is a species of flowering plant in the family Asteraceae and is endemic to south-eastern Australia. It is an erect, bushy, glabrous shrub with linear leaves and mauve, pink or white and yellow, daisy-like inflorescences.

Description

Taxonomy
Sticky daisy-bush was first formally described in 1839 by John Lindley who gave it the name Eurybia glutinosa in Edwards's Botanical Register, from specimens of plants raised by the Royal Horticultural Society from seed collected by Daniel Bunce. In 1867, George Bentham changed the name to Olearia glutinosa in Flora Australiensis. The specific epithet (glutinosa) means "sticky".

Distribution and habitat
Olearia glutinosa grows in scrub on coastal dunes or on sandstone or limestone cliffs on the coast of Victoria, south-eastern South Australia, and the north and west coasts of Tasmania, including on King Island.

References

glutinosa
Asterales of Australia
Flora of Victoria (Australia)
Flora of Tasmania
Flora of South Australia
Taxa named by John Lindley
Plants described in 1839